Dyersburg Regional Airport  is two miles south of Dyersburg, in Dyer County, Tennessee, United States. It was formerly Dyersburg Municipal Airport.

Most U.S. airports use the same three-letter location identifier for the FAA and IATA, but this airport is DYR to the FAA and has no IATA code. (IATA assigned DYR to Anadyr Airport in Anadyr, Russia.)

In 1957-59 it was served by Southeast Airlines DC-3s, and in 1961-63 by Southern Airlines DC-3s. (In 1962, 134 passengers boarded Southern's DC-3s.)

Facilities
It has two asphalt runways: 4/22 is 5,698 by 100 feet (1,737 x 30 m) and 16/34 is 4,000 by 75 feet. The FAA has classified runway 4/22 to be in good condition, while the shorter 16/34 runway is listed in poor condition with major cracks in the asphalt. Due to the condition of the runway, 16/34 has been indefinitely closed since October 2019. 

In the year ending April 12, 1996 the airport had 19,400 aircraft operations, average 53 per day: 94% general aviation, 3% air taxi and 3% military. 22 aircraft were then based at this airport: 77% single-engine and 23% multi-engine.

Incidents
 1963 Camden PA-24 crash 
 Singers Patsy Cline, Cowboy Copas and Hawkshaw Hawkins were killed about a half-hour after their private Piper Comanche flew out of the airport on March 5, 1963 when it crashed near Camden, Tennessee while en route to Nashville. Their plane had left Fairfax Airport in Kansas City, Kansas where they had performed a concert and had stopped in Dyersburg to refuel.

References

External links 
 Aerial photo as of 13 February 1999 from USGS The National Map
 

Airports in Tennessee
Buildings and structures in Dyer County, Tennessee
Transportation in Dyer County, Tennessee